The Seleguá is a river in Guatemala.

References

External links
Map of Guatemala including the river

Rivers of Guatemala
Geography of Mesoamerica
Rivers of Chiapas
International rivers of North America